Kharsia is one of the 90 Legislative Assembly constituencies of Chhattisgarh state in India. It is in Raigarh district.

Members of Legislative Assembly
 1977: Laxmi Patel(Indian National Congress)
 1980: Laxmi Patel(Indian national congress)
 1985: Laxmi Patel (Indian national congress)
 1989 ( by polls) : Arjun Singh (Indian National Congress )
 1990: Nandkumar Patel ( Indian National Congress)
 1993: Nandkumar Patel (Indian national congress)
 1998: Nandkumar Patel(Indian national congress)
 2003: Nandkumar Patel (Indian national congress)
 2008: Nandkumar Patel, (Indian National Congress)
 2013: Umesh Patel, (Indian National Congress)

Election results

2018

See also
List of constituencies of the Chhattisgarh Legislative Assembly
Raigarh district

References

Raigarh district
Assembly constituencies of Chhattisgarh